Raúl Peinador (born 14 August 1968) is a Spanish fencer. He competed in the individual and team sabre events at the 1992 and 1996 Summer Olympics.

References

External links
 

1968 births
Living people
Spanish male sabre fencers
Olympic fencers of Spain
Fencers at the 1992 Summer Olympics
Fencers at the 1996 Summer Olympics
Fencers from Madrid